Fran Flory (born April 30, c. 1962) is an American retired head coach of the LSU Tigers women's indoor volleyball team and former head coach of the LSU Tigers women's beach volleyball team.

Coaching career
Flory is the former women's volleyball head coach at the University of Kentucky, Southeastern Louisiana University and Wittenberg University.

She is first in all-time SEC wins and all-time wins at LSU, ahead of her predecessor, Scott Luster, who won 308 games in 13 years. Her LSU teams have captured seven consecutive SEC Western Division championships (2005–2011) as well as the 2009 SEC championship.

Flory began her coaching career as head coach at Wittenberg University, where she coached for one season (posting a record of 11–21) in 1986. In 1987, she became an assistant coach at Texas A&M.

After one season at Texas A&M, Flory, a Baton Rouge, Louisiana native moved to LSU as an assistant for four years under head coach  Scott Luster. She served as a graduate assistant coach in 1988, before being named a full-time assistant in 1989. During her four seasons as a member of the Lady Tigers (now Tigers) coaching staff, Flory helped LSU to unprecedented success with three SEC championships, three SEC Tournament championships and two NCAA Final Four appearances.

In 1992, Flory left LSU to assume the head coaching position at Southeastern Louisiana University. In her one season at Southeastern Louisiana, she led the Lady Lions to a 21–13 record. In March 1993, Flory returned to the SEC as she became an assistant coach at the University of Kentucky. Five months later, she was named the head coach as then-UK coach Kathy DeBoer was named an associate athletic director at the school.

In her first season at Kentucky in 1993, Flory led the Lady Kats to a 29–4 record, while advancing to the second round of the NCAA Tournament. For her efforts, she was named the 1993 Tachikara/AVCA Region IV Coach of the Year. In five seasons at UK, Flory compiled a 78–80 record with the Lady Kats/Wildcats (the nickname changed in 1995).

In 1998, Flory returned to Baton Rouge, Louisiana as head coach of the LSU women's indoor volleyball team. 

When LSU established a varsity beach volleyball program starting in the 2013–2014 season, Flory also became head coach of that team. She remained the beach volleyball head coach until 2016, when Russell Brock was promoted from associate head coach to head coach and Flory focused on her duties as indoor women's head coach. 

Flory is a member of the American Volleyball Coaches Association, Flory has also assisted in coordinating both the Louisiana Senior Olympic Games and the Special Olympics, and hosting the Senior Olympic Games in 2001. She is also a member of the United States Volleyball Association coaching accreditation program.

Flory was inducted into the American Volleyball Coaches Association Hall of Fame in 2022.

Playing career
A 1984 graduate of the University of Texas, Flory has also experienced much success as a player. In 1981, she was a member of Texas' AIAW National Championship squad. She received All-Southwest Conference and All-South Region honors during three seasons with the Longhorns.

Collegiate head coaching record

Indoor

Beach

References

External links
LSU Lady Tigers bio 

American volleyball coaches
Living people
1960s births
Year of birth missing (living people)
Texas Longhorns women's volleyball players
Texas A&M Aggies women's volleyball coaches
Southeastern Louisiana Lady Lions volleyball coaches
Kentucky Wildcats women's volleyball coaches
LSU Tigers women's volleyball coaches
LSU Tigers women's beach volleyball coaches